Shamrock III was a yacht that was the Royal Ulster Yacht Club's entry for the 1903 America's Cup.

History
The yacht was designed by William Fife, and was built by William Denny and Brothers of Dumbarton, Scotland. The yacht was launched on 17 March 1903. It participated in the 1903 America's Cup and was defeated by the New York Yacht Club's Reliance in all three races on 20 August 1903; and 25 August 1903; and 3 September 1903. In 1920 the yacht was used for test racing against Shamrock IV and afterward was scrapped.

References

External links

Shamrock III at IMDb
Shamrock III images at the Royal Ulster Yacht Club

America's Cup challengers
Individual yachts
1903 ships
Ships built on the River Clyde